Belews Creek Steam Station is a 2.24-GW, two-unit coal-fired generating facility located on Belews Lake in Stokes County, North Carolina. It is Duke Energy’s largest coal-burning power plant in the Carolinas and consistently ranks among the most efficient coal facilities in the United States. During 2006, it was the fifth most efficient coal power plant in the United States with a heat rate of 9,023 Btu/kWh (37.8% conversion efficiency). The remaining 62.2% of energy released by the burning coal is in the form of heat. It is dumped into Belews Lake, a man-made lake created by Duke Power for cooling water purposes in the early 1970s.

The plant consists of two nearly identical units, launched into operation in 1974 and 1975. All four generators (two low pressure generators and two high pressure/intermediate pressure generators) are Westinghouse generators. The low pressure, intermediate pressure and high pressure steam turbines were originally Westinghouse units, but were replaced over time with Alstom steam-path upgraded components. The turbine valves are the originally installed Westinghouse equipment.

The plant employs multiple pollution control systems, including a selective catalytic reducer which removes nitrogen oxides, an electrostatic precipitator which removes fly ash, and low NOx burners in the boiler. The plant has completed a $500 million flue-gas desulfurization project which came online during the beginning of 2008. This project has reduced the plant's sulfur dioxide emissions by 95%.

See also

 List of largest power stations in the United States
 Global warming

References

External links
 Duke Energy - Belews Creek Steam Station
 Electric Light & Power - 2006 Operating Performance Ratings
  Electric Light & Power - 2008 Operating Performance Ratings

Energy infrastructure completed in 1974
Energy infrastructure completed in 1975
Coal-fired power stations in North Carolina
Buildings and structures in Stokes County, North Carolina
Duke Energy